Sandi Bowen (born 12 February 1976 in Melbourne) was an Australian female volleyball player. She was part of the Australia women's national volleyball team.

She competed with the national team at the 2000 Summer Olympics in Sydney, Australia, finishing 9th. She also played at the 2002 FIVB Volleyball Women's World Championship in Germany. On club level she played with Monbulk VC.

Clubs
 Monbulk VC (2002)

See also
 Australia at the 2000 Summer Olympics

References

External links
 
 
 

1976 births
Living people
Australian women's volleyball players
Place of birth missing (living people)
Volleyball players at the 2000 Summer Olympics
Olympic volleyball players of Australia
People from Melbourne
Wing spikers